Ken William Cooley (born March 18, 1953) is an American politician, who served in the California State Assembly. He is a Democrat and represented California's 8th Assembly District, which encompasses most of eastern Sacramento County, including the cities of Carmichael and Citrus Heights.
Following the 2020 Census, Cooley ran for a sixth term in the 7th Assembly District during the 2022 November Elections but lost to Republican Josh Hoover.   

Prior to being elected to the Assembly in 2012, he was a Mayor and City Councilmember in Rancho Cordova.

Biography
Born in Berkeley and raised in San Lorenzo, Hayward, and San Jose, Cooley graduated from the University of California, Berkeley, in 1977 and the McGeorge School of Law at the University of the Pacific in 1984.

From 1977 to 1985, Cooley was Chief of Staff to state Assemblyman Lou Papan. From 1985 to 1988, Cooley was Legislative Counsel at the California Land Title Association. In 1988, Cooley returned to the California State Assembly to be chief counsel to the Finance and Insurance Committee. Cooley was legal counsel to State Farm Insurance from 1991 to 2008.

In 2002, Cooley was elected to the Rancho Cordova City Council.  In 2005, he became Mayor.

2014 California State Assembly

2016 California State Assembly

2018 California State Assembly

2020 California State Assembly

References

External links 
 
 Campaign website
 Former and Current Mayors and City Council Members
 Join California Ken Cooley
 

1955 births
Democratic Party members of the California State Assembly
Living people
Politicians from Berkeley, California
People from Hayward, California
People from Rancho Cordova, California
Politicians from San Jose, California
Mayors of places in California
California lawyers
McGeorge School of Law alumni
University of California, Berkeley alumni
People from San Lorenzo, California
21st-century American politicians